Miguel Ángel Mansilla Acuña (25 April 1953 – 26 June 2013) was a Uruguayan professional footballer who played as a forward.

Club career
Born in Cerro Largo, Mansilla came through the youth ranks at and made his professional debut for local giants Peñarol in 1971 and also played for River Plate Montevideo before moving abroad to enjoy a lengthy spell at Argentine side Chacarita Juniors. In 1977, he moved to Saprissa and became the Costa Rica Premier Division top goalscorer in 1977 with 27 goals.

After a short stint in Ecuador with Cuenca, he returned to Costa Rica to finish his career at Municipal Puntarenas.

Managerial career
After retiring as a player, Mansilla moved to Panama to take charge of the national team. He subsequently managed Panamanian outfit Tauro on four occasions, winning 5 league titles. On 26 February 1988, he became the first coach to manage in the then newly formed ANAPROF league when Tauro met Plaza Amador. He was in the hot seat at several other Panamanian clubs and won another title with Chorrillo in the 2011 Apertura season. He also managed Once Municipal, winning a Salvadoran title, and Alianza in El Salvador.

Death
Mansilla died in June 2013, aged 60. He was reportedly transferred from the San Judas Tadeo Clinic in Panama City to the Complejo de la Caja de Seguro Social where he suffered a brain aneurysm and subsequently died from cardiac arrest.

References

1953 births
2013 deaths
People from Cerro Largo Department
Association football forwards
Uruguayan footballers
Peñarol players
Club Atlético River Plate (Montevideo) players
Chacarita Juniors footballers
Deportivo Saprissa players
C.D. Cuenca footballers
Puntarenas F.C. players
Uruguayan expatriate footballers
Expatriate footballers in Argentina
Expatriate footballers in Costa Rica
Expatriate footballers in Ecuador
Uruguayan football managers
Panama national football team managers
San Francisco F.C. managers
Tauro F.C. managers
Chorrillo F.C. managers
Expatriate football managers in Panama
Expatriate football managers in El Salvador
Liga Panameña de Fútbol managers